Milevci is a village in the municipality of Bosilegrad, Serbia. According to the 2002 census, the town has a population of  140 people.

References

Populated places in Pčinja District
Bulgarian communities in Serbia